Agrotis perigramma is a moth of the family Noctuidae. It was first described by Edward Meyrick in 1899. It is endemic to the island of Hawaii.

External links

Agrotis
Endemic moths of Hawaii
Moths described in 1899